aka Tora-san Meets a Lady Scholar is a 1975 Japanese comedy film directed by Yoji Yamada. It stars Kiyoshi Atsumi as Torajirō Kuruma (Tora-san), and Fumie Kashiyama as his love interest or "Madonna". Tora-san, the Intellectual is the sixteenth entry in the popular, long-running Otoko wa Tsurai yo series.

Synopsis
Tora-san returns to his family's shop in Shibamata, Tokyo to find himself accused of being the father of a 17-year-old girl. It turns out that Tora-san had only given help to the girl's mother after her husband had left her. Tora-san becomes infatuated with the female archeology student who is staying with his family, and attempts to take up intellectual pursuits to get near her.

Cast
 Kiyoshi Atsumi as Torajirō
 Chieko Baisho as Sakura
 Fumie Kashiyama as Reiko
 Junko Sakurada as Junko Mogami
 Keiju Kobayashi as Professor Tadokoro
 Masami Shimojō as Tatsuzō Kuruma (Torajiro's uncle)
 Chieko Misaki as Tsune Kuruma (Torajiro's aunt)
 Gin Maeda as Hiroshi Suwa
 Hayato Nakamura as Mitsuo Suwa
 Hisao Dazai as Boss (Umetarō Katsura)
 Gajirō Satō as Genkō
 Chishū Ryū as Gozen-sama

Critical appraisal
A 1977 review in The New York Times judged Tora-san, the Intellectual to be "genuinely warm and charming". The review commented that Yoji Yamada's script was "convoluted" and the directing "uneven", but that "Mr. Yamada is decidedly professional in shaping a colorful and briskly moving story," and that the film as a whole "project[s] contemporary Japanese family life and ties realistically and affectionately." The German-language site molodezhnaja gives Tora-san, the Intellectual three and a half out of five stars.

Availability
Tora-san, the Intellectual was released theatrically on December 27, 1975. In Japan, the film was released on videotape in 1996, and in DVD format in 2005 and 2008. The film played for two days in New York in 1977 during which time it received a review in The New York Times.

References

Bibliography

English

German

Japanese

External links
 Tora-san, the Intellectual at www.tora-san.jp (official site)

1975 films
Films directed by Yoji Yamada
1975 comedy films
1970s Japanese-language films
Otoko wa Tsurai yo films
Shochiku films
Films with screenplays by Yôji Yamada
Japanese sequel films
1970s Japanese films